Nedaa Elias (Arabic: نداء الياس; born 15 January 1981 in Damascus) is a Syrian artist and writer whose works address environmental and cultural concerns pertaining to contemporary Middle Eastern societies. Subjects previously explored by Elias include the discontinuation of the usage of the Arabic script, as well as the effect of bird migration on the gulf’s economy.

Biography
Nedaa Elias studied Fine Art at faculty of Art and Design at the University of Jordan and later obtained his Masters of Fine Arts in Visual Communication Design from Istanbul Bilgi University, Turkey. Nedaa Elias focuses on public installation art. In 2017 he was nominated as best solo international artist at World Art Dubai where he featured his installation, Pursuit of Abjad. As per an article published in Al Bayan Newspaper in United Arab Emirates, his creations represent the relationship between people and culture from different perspectives where he invites the audience to interact with the works and interpret the outcomes. For his research on Paul Klee's color theory, Nedaa Elias was cited by Art history scholar Sztabińska Paulina in her book "The performative turn in the visual arts - The art of Paul Klee" and The Daily Hatch.

Exhibitions 

 UAE Pearl, public installation exhibition featuring the migration of birds in the UAE, Zabeel Park, Dubai, United Arab Emirates, 2016
 Pursuit of Abjad public installation exhibition, DIFC Art Nights, Dubai, United Arab Emirates, 2017
 Pursuit of Abjad, public installation exhibition, World Art Dubai, Dubai, United Arab Emirates, 2017
 Down the Rabbit Hole public installation exhibition, DIFC Art Nights, Dubai, United Arab Emirates, 2019

Publications 

 Guernica Dance, article, Al Rai Newspaper, Jordan
Ektemal Triology, A reading into the Clay Artworks of Prof. Khaled Al Hamza, Afkar, Jordan
Paul Klee Making the Visible, article, Al Tashkeel, Emirates Fine Arts Society – United Arab Emirates

Artworks

References 

Installation artists
Syrian contemporary artists
People from Damascus
Syrian writers
Syrian artists
1981 births
Living people